Elmer is an unincorporated community in Potter County, Pennsylvania, United States.

Notable person
Fred Churchill Leonard, member of the United States House of Representatives, was born in Elmer.

Notes

Unincorporated communities in Potter County, Pennsylvania
Unincorporated communities in Pennsylvania